Iris Cahn is a full professor and chair of the Film Conservatory at SUNY Purchase College in Purchase, New York.

Biography
Cahn earned her B.F.A. from SUNY Purchase College and her M.A. from New York University.  She edits feature films and documentaries, including Powaqqatsi (directed by Godfrey Reggio, music composed by Philip Glass), Worst Possible illusion: The Curiosity Cabinet of Vik Muniz (also receiving writing credit), Fragments of Kubelka, Lessons From and American Primary (which she also produced), Devo: Are We Not Men?, and directed short films which have screened at the New York Film Festival and on network television. She was nominated for two Emmy Awards for specials and a series. Her work has appeared at the Cannes and Sundance Film Festivals, in addition to Berlin, Lincoln Center and the Robert Flaherty Film Festivals.

References

Living people
State University of New York at Purchase faculty
Year of birth missing (living people)